Evgeny Konstantinovich Karlovskiy (born 7 August 1994) is a Russian tennis player.

Karlovskiy has a career high ATP singles ranking of 211 achieved on 17 June 2019. He also has a career high doubles ranking of 222 achieved on 29 July 2019. Karlovskiy has won 1 ATP Challenger singles title at the 2018 Nielsen Pro Tennis Championships.

Challenger and Futures/World Tennis Tour finals

Singles: 19 (9–10)

Doubles: 22 (12–10)

References

External links
 
 
 

1994 births
Living people
Russian male tennis players
Tennis players from Moscow